Nizhnyaya Tura is a town in Sverdlovsk Oblast, Russia, located on the Tura River (Ob's basin),  north of Yekaterinburg. Population:

History
It was founded in 1754; town status was granted to it in 1949.  Nizhnyaya Tura railway station was opened in 1906.

Administrative and municipal status
Within the framework of the administrative divisions, it is, together with twenty-one rural localities, incorporated as the Town of Nizhnyaya Tura—an administrative unit with the status equal to that of the districts. As a municipal division, the Town of Nizhnyaya Tura is incorporated as Nizhneturinsky Urban Okrug.

References

Notes

Sources

Cities and towns in Sverdlovsk Oblast
Verkhotursky Uyezd
Populated places established in 1754
1754 establishments in the Russian Empire